The Empty Bottle is a bar and music venue located at 1035 N. Western Avenue in Chicago, Illinois. Located on the west side of Chicago's Ukrainian Village neighborhood, the venue primarily hosts local, regional, and touring alternative music acts, but also hosts acts ranging from indie-rock, punk, metal, rock'n'roll, hip-hop, electronic, experimental, and jazz. The venue was opened by Bruce Finkelman in 1992, originally a simple neighborhood bar. In 1993 the club moved to its current location, two blocks from its original location. The venue also owns a connected restaurant next door called Bite Cafe. The Empty Bottle is open 7 days a week and hosts performances every night. As of 2018, Bruce Finkelman and Craig Golde, through their firm 16” on Center, own, co-own, operate, and/or co-operate several music venues, including The Empty Bottle, The Promontory, Evanston S.P.A.C.E., Sonotheque (which closed in 2009), and Thalia Hall, all in and near Chicago. Finkelman and Golden are similarly affiliated with several other restaurants and bars, both at those music venues and free-standing, including Bite Cafe, Dusek's, and Longman & Eagle.

The offices of indie record label Flameshovel Records were located directly above the venue.

In August 2009, The Empty Bottle lost "Radley", its house cat of nearly 20 years, who was much loved by staff, patrons, and musicians.

"The Empty Bottle Chicago: 21+ Years of Music / Friendly / Dancing, a 200-page oral history...[from]...local indie publisher Curbside Splendor," edited by John E. Dugan with an introduction by John Darnielle, was released in June 2016. "The book's subtitle references the words on the canopy over the club's front door."

References

External links

Music venues in Chicago
Nightclubs in Chicago